Romilly Sarah Weeks (15 December 1973 in Paddington, London) is an English journalist who is a political correspondent and news presenter for ITV News.

Media career
After a career in acting, Weeks entered broadcast journalism. She has travelled extensively while reporting for ITV News. She was embedded with the British Army during the Second Gulf War, reported from Thailand after the 2004 tsunami, and has covered many royal tours in her role as Royal Correspondent.

During Queen Elizabeth II's 60th wedding anniversary, Weeks was broadcasting live on air when she was surprised by Prince Philip.

In 2003, she became a regular newscaster on the now closed ITV News Channel. From 2006, she combined roles as royal correspondent and news presenter for ITV News; until 2008 she was also a occasional presenter for ITV London. In 2009, she became a News Correspondent, and in 2012, was promoted to political correspondent.

Personal life
Weeks lives in London. Her husband Nick Green opened an upmarket kebab shop in Farringdon in 2015 called Chifafa.

References

External links

1973 births
Living people
British television newsreaders and news presenters
British women television journalists
English television journalists
English women journalists
ITN newsreaders and journalists
People from Paddington
Royal correspondents